Nazier Dindar (12 February 1966 – 6 July 2015) was a South African cricketer. He played 31 first-class matches for Transvaal between 1983 and 1992.

References

External links
 

1966 births
2015 deaths
South African cricketers
Gauteng cricketers
Sportspeople from Gauteng